The Nevada Department of Tourism and Cultural Affairs is a state government agency in Nevada that focuses on the promotion and regulation of Nevada's tourism and cultural industries and landmarks.

History 
The department was the result of a merge between the existing commission on tourism and the Nevada Department of Cultural Affairs. The commission on tourism was founded in 1983, consisting of two divisions, a tourism division and a publication division. The latter published the Nevada Magazine, which has been in circulation since 1936 after it was first published by the state highway department under the name Nevada Highway and Parks.

The Nevada Department of Cultural Affairs was originally known as the Department of Museums, Library, and Arts and was founded in 1993. The current structure of the newly merged department was put in place following a 2011 Nevada statute. Within this structure, the commission of tourism remained as a separate entity under the supervision of the Nevada Department of Tourism and Cultural Affairs.

Divisions 
The department consists of seven divisions, which are the following:

 The Division of Tourism
 The Division of Museums and History
 The Board of Museums and History
 The Nevada Arts Council
 The Nevada Indian Commission
 The Board of the Nevada Arts Council
 The Commission on Tourism

See also 

 Nevada State Museum, Carson City
 Nevada State Museum, Las Vegas

References 

State agencies of Nevada